Xylosma palawanensis is a species of flowering plant in the family Salicaceae. It is endemic to the Philippines.

References

Flora of the Philippines
palawanensis
Vulnerable plants
Plants described in 1965
Taxonomy articles created by Polbot